A Woman Is a Woman is a 1961 French musical romantic comedy film written and directed by Jean-Luc Godard, starring Jean-Paul Belmondo, Anna Karina and Jean-Claude Brialy. It is a tribute to American musical comedy and associated with the French New Wave. It is Godard's third feature film (the release of his second, Le petit soldat, was delayed by censorship), and his first in color and Cinemascope.

Plot
The film centers on the relationship of exotic dancer Angéla and her lover Émile. Angéla wants to have a child, but Émile is not ready. Émile's best friend Alfred also says he loves Angéla, and keeps up a gentle pursuit. Angéla and Émile argue about the matter; at one point they decide not to speak to each other, so continue their argument by pulling books from the shelf and pointing to the titles. Since Émile stubbornly refuses her request for a child, Angéla finally decides to accept Alfred's plea and sleeps with him. This proves that she will do what she must to have a child. She and Émile finally reconcile, so he has a chance to become the father. The two have sex, then engage in a bit of wordplay that gives the film its title: an exasperated Émile says "Angéla, tu es infâme" ("Angela, you are horrid"), and she retorts, "Non, je suis une femme" ("No, I am a woman").

Cast
 Anna Karina as Angela
 Jean-Claude Brialy as Émile Récamier
 Jean-Paul Belmondo as Alfred Lubitsch 
 Henri Attal as false blind man #2 (uncredited)
 Karyn Balm (uncredited)
 Dorothée Blank as prostitute 3 (uncredited)
 Marie Dubois as Angela's friend (uncredited)
 Ernest Menzer as bar owner (uncredited)
 Jeanne Moreau as woman in bar (herself)
 Nicole Paquin as Suzanne (uncredited)
 Gisèle Sandré as prostitute 2 (uncredited)
 Marion Sarraut as prostitute 1 (uncredited)
 Dominique Zardi as false blind man #1 (uncredited)

Awards
 11th Berlin International Film Festival
 Silver Bear for Best Actress (Karina - won)
 Silver Bear Extraordinary Jury Prize (won)
 Golden Bear (nominated)

References

External links
 
 
 A Woman Is a Woman, an essay by J. Hoberman at the Criterion Collection

1961 films
1961 musical comedy films
1961 romantic comedy films
1960s French-language films
1960s romantic musical films
Films directed by Jean-Luc Godard
Films produced by Carlo Ponti
Films scored by Michel Legrand
Films set in Paris
Films shot in Paris
French musical comedy films
French romantic comedy films
French romantic musical films
1960s French films